Plumsteadville is a census-designated place in Plumstead Township, Bucks County, Pennsylvania, United States.  It is located along Pennsylvania Route 611, approximately eight miles north of Doylestown.  As of the 2010 census, the population was 2,637 residents.

Demographics

Community
The local school district is Central Bucks and children attend Groveland Elementary School. Plumsteadville also has plenty of access to outdoor activities. These activities include a bike ride to Tinicum Park, rock climbing at High Rocks and hiking. Neighborhoods in the area are conducive to groups of children gathering for playtime activities.

The Plumsteadville Village Business Alliance was recently launched in May 2016 to organize and start working together with local businesses towards developing future business growth and strong community alliances with their neighbors. In turn, their efforts will build more commerce which will enhance the growth of their businesses, will work towards building the vital local economy and will help local entrepreneurs compete successfully.

Notable person
Alfred J. Sellers (1836-1908), Medal of Honor recipient

References

Census-designated places in Bucks County, Pennsylvania
Census-designated places in Pennsylvania